Dendropanax laurifolius is a tree in the family Araliaceae. It is endemic to Puerto Rico, and is found in moist regions of forests at middle or high elevations.

References

Araliaceae
Endemic flora of Puerto Rico
Flora without expected TNC conservation status